Everybody's Sweetheart is a 1920 American silent comedy-drama film directed by Laurence Trimble and Alan Crosland and written by John Lynch. The film stars Olive Thomas and William Collier, Jr. Everybody's Sweetheart was Thomas' final film role and was released nearly a month after her death from acute nephritis (due to accidental ingestion of mercury bichloride) in Paris on September 10, 1920.

A copy of Everybody's Sweetheart is preserved in the George Eastman House Motion Picture Collection.

Plot
As described in a film magazine, Mary (Thomas) and John (Collier), residents of the county poor farm, have had their lots cast there by a train wreck from which they were taken as babies and the identity of their parents lost. The two are the closest of friends and Mary is everybody's sweetheart about the place. She concentrates her gospel of cheer and kindness of heart, however, on John and old Corporal Joe (Wilson), a Civil War veteran, mothering the two most solicitously. When John is placed out to work on a neighboring farm and there is a change in matrons that makes life at the county farm house unbearable, the Corporal and Mary, the latter in clothes taken from a scarecrow, leave with John accompanying them. Illness of the Corporal forces them to take refuge in the home of the wealthy General Phillip Bingham (Dowling), who proves to be the Corporal's old chief from the war. The General promises the dying veteran that he will take care of Mary. John is engaged to assist the gardener. One day, wearing the uniform of a West Point cadet that he donned while rummaging in the attic, John assumes such a likeness to the General's dear and disowned son that he is proved to be a son of the latter. Both John and Mary are offered the shelter of the General's home with the expectation that they will marry when they come of age.

Cast

 Olive Thomas as Mary
 William Collier Jr. as John
 Joseph Dowling as General Phillip Bingham 
 Aileen Manning as Mrs. Willing
 Martha Mattox as Miss Blodgett
 Hal Wilson as Corporal Joe
 Bob Hick as Mr. Willing
 Philip Sleeman (Minor Role) (uncredited)

References

External links

 
 
 

1920 films
1920 comedy-drama films
American silent feature films
American black-and-white films
Films directed by Laurence Trimble
Films directed by Alan Crosland
Selznick Pictures films
1920s American films
Silent American comedy-drama films
1920s English-language films